Pilioniai is a village in Kėdainiai district municipality, in Kaunas County, in central Lithuania. It is located by the Dotnuvėlė river and Mantviliškis pond. According to the 2011 census, the village has a population of 57 people. There is a hillfort and a chapel on its top in Pilioniai.

Demography

References

Villages in Kaunas County
Kėdainiai District Municipality